The 2017 Cork Premier Intermediate Football Championship was the 12th staging of the Cork Premier Intermediate Football Championship since its establishment by the Cork County Board in 2006. The draw for the 2017 fixtures took place on 11 December 2016. The championship began on 15 April 2017 and ended on 15 October 2017.

On 15 October 2017, Mallow won the championship following a 1-17 to 1-16 defeat of St Michael's in the final at Páirc Uí Chaoimh. It was their second championship title overall and their first title since 2007.

Éire Óg's Daniel Goulding was the championship's top scorer with 1-27.

Results

Round 1

Round 2A

Round 2B

Relegation playoffs

Round 3

Quarter-finals

Semi-finals

Final

Championship statistics

Top scorers

Overall

In a single game

References

Cork Premier Intermediate Football Championship